Keith Armstrong (born December 15, 1963) is an American football coach who is the special teams coordinator for the Tampa Bay Buccaneers of the National Football League (NFL). Armstrong has over two decades of professional coaching experience. He played college football at Temple.

On December 31, 2012, NFL.com reported that Armstrong was expected to be interviewed by the Chicago Bears for the head coaching position after Lovie Smith's firing. He also met with the Philadelphia Eagles about possibly replacing Andy Reid.

In the 2016 season, Armstrong and the Falcons reached Super Bowl LI, where they faced the New England Patriots. In the Super Bowl, the Falcons fell in a 34–28 overtime defeat.

On January 9, 2019, Armstrong agreed to become special teams coordinator of the Tampa Bay Buccaneers, rejoining the staff of Bruce Arians who was the head coach of the Temple Owls when Armstrong began his coaching career. Armstrong earned his first Super Bowl title when the Buccaneers won Super Bowl LV.

Personal life
Armstrong grew up in Levittown, Pennsylvania, and played high school football at Bishop Egan High School in Fairless Hills, Pennsylvania. Keith and his wife, Kathleen, have two daughters, Kaitlin and Kristen.

References

1963 births
Living people
African-American coaches of American football
African-American players of American football
Players of American football from Trenton, New Jersey
American football running backs
American football defensive backs
Temple Owls football players
Miami Hurricanes football coaches
Akron Zips football coaches
Oklahoma State Cowboys football coaches
Notre Dame Fighting Irish football coaches
Atlanta Falcons coaches
Chicago Bears coaches
Miami Dolphins coaches
21st-century African-American people
20th-century African-American sportspeople
Tampa Bay Buccaneers coaches